Bective is a locality in New South Wales, located on the Oxley Highway about 18 kilometres WNW of Tamworth.

The name originally appears at the name of a large pastoral property near the Peel River in the 1860s.  The name is derived from a town near Dublin,  or an abbey located there, or from Lord Bective, a notable British cabinet minister of the era whose title name derives from that place.

Populated places in New South Wales